SS Fortress Regiment 1  was an improvised unit of the Waffen SS formed in February 1945, during World War II, for service in the defence of the German city of Breslau, during the Red Army's Siege of Breslau. The regiment engaged in savage house to house fighting against the invading Red Army that lasted 82 days but surrendered at the end of the siege on 6 May 1945.

Commander
SS-Obersturmbannführer Georg-Robert Besslein

References

Munoz, Antonio J - Forgotten Legions: Obscure Combat Formations of the Waffen-SS

Military units and formations of the Waffen-SS
Military units and formations established in 1945
Military units and formations disestablished in 1945
1945 establishments in Germany
1945 disestablishments in Germany